Walter Ernest Pullen (2 August 1919 – 1977) was an English professional footballer who made over 110 appearances in the Football League for Leyton Orient as an inside forward.

Personal life 
Pullen served in the Queen's Royal Regiment (West Surrey) during the Second World War.

References 

English Football League players
Clapton Orient F.C. wartime guest players
English footballers
Association football inside forwards
1919 births
1977 deaths
Fulham F.C. players
Leyton Orient F.C. players
Gloucester City A.F.C. players
Southern Football League players
Dunstable Town F.C. players
Dunstable Town F.C. managers
British Army personnel of World War II
Queen's Royal Regiment soldiers
Sportspeople from Surrey
English football managers
Military personnel from Surrey